Reginald W. Manning (April 8, 1905 – March 10, 1986) was an American artist and illustrator, best known for his editorial cartoons.

Biography
Manning was born in Kansas City, Missouri, but he came to live in Phoenix, Arizona. Manning's only art training occurred during high school. After graduating, Manning worked as a freelancer. In 1926, The Arizona Republic hired Manning as a photographer and artist. At first, Manning's work appeared in several forms in the paper. Although he was interested in drawing comic strips, the popularity of his editorial work led him to focus on editorial cartoons. His work was syndicated in as many as 170 newspapers.

Manning often used a small anthropomorphic cactus with a big nose as a visual signature. From 1948 until 1971, his work was syndicated by the McNaught Syndicate. In 1951, Manning won a Pulitzer Prize for Editorial Cartooning for an editorial cartoon entitled "Hats", which was a commentary on the Korean War.

Several of his books deal with Arizona and its cacti in particular, such as What Kinda Cactus Izzat? (also known as The Cactus Book), and What is Arizona Really Like?: A Guide to Arizona's Marvels.

Reg Manning did exceptional copper wheel engravings on crystal glass. See his book Desert in Crystal (1973). He also produced postcards, jewelry, stationery and water colors, all dealing with Western themes.

Manning died on March 10, 1986, in Scottsdale, Arizona.

His papers are held at Wichita State University, Arizona State University. and Syracuse University.

Works
Reg Manning's Cartoon Guide of Arizona, J. J. Augustine, 1938
Reg Manning's Cartoon Guide of California, J. J. Augustine, 1939
Reg Manning's cartoon guide of the Boulder dam country, J. J. Augustine, 1939
What Kinda Cactus Izzat?, J. J. Augustine, 1941
Little Itchy Itchy And Other Cartoons, J. J. Augustine, 1944
From Tee to Cup, Reganson Cartoon Books, 1954
What Is Arizona Really Like?, Reganson Cartoon Books, 1968
Desert in Crystal, Reganson Cartoon Books, 1973
Best of Reg, Reg Manning and Dean Smith, Arizona Republic, 1980

References

Further reading
 Heitzmann, William Ray. "The political cartoon as a teaching device." Teaching Political Science 6.2 (1979): 166-184. https://doi.org/10.1080/00922013.1979.11000158
 McCarthy, Michael P. "Political Cartoons in the History Classroom." History Teacher 11.1 (1977): 29-38. online

External links
 An example of a Reg Manning editorial cartoon

1905 births
1986 deaths
Pulitzer Prize for Editorial Cartooning winners
American editorial cartoonists